Radviliškis–Daugavpils Railway is one of the main local railways in Lithuania with connection to neighbouring Latvia. This railway connects Lithuanian city Radviliškis with Latvia's second largest city of Daugavpils.

The railway was opened in 1873 as part of Libau–Romny Railway system.

References 

Radviliškis
Transport in Daugavpils
Railway lines in Lithuania
Railway lines in Latvia
1520 mm gauge railways in Lithuania